Jeremiah J. "Miah" Murray (January 1, 1865 – January 11, 1922) was an American catcher in Major League Baseball for four seasons, then umpired full-time for one season. His career totals include 34 games played, 120 at bats, and 17 hits for a .142 batting average.

Later, he became a full-time umpire for the National League in  when he officiated in 112 games. He is also credited with seven ejections during the 1895 season. Murray died at the age of 57 in his hometown of Boston, Massachusetts, and is interred at Holyhood Cemetery in Brookline, Massachusetts.

References

External links

1865 births
1922 deaths
Baseball players from Boston
Major League Baseball catchers
19th-century baseball players
Providence Grays players
Louisville Colonels players
Washington Nationals (1886–1889) players
Washington Statesmen players
Brooklyn Grays (Interstate Association) players
Reading Actives players
Hartford (minor league baseball) players
Indianapolis Hoosiers (minor league) players
Haverhill (minor league baseball) players
Rochester Maroons players
Minneapolis Millers (baseball) players
London Tecumsehs (baseball) players
Allentown (minor league baseball) players
Lancaster (minor league baseball) players
Wilmington Blue Hens players
Burials at Holyhood Cemetery (Brookline)